Slaviča Kundačina (born 26 April 1955) is a Yugoslav gymnast. She competed at the 1972 Summer Olympics.

References

External links
 

1955 births
Living people
Yugoslav female artistic gymnasts
Olympic gymnasts of Yugoslavia
Gymnasts at the 1972 Summer Olympics
Place of birth missing (living people)